Delap (Marshallese:) is an island district in the Marshall Islands. It is located in the east of Majuro Atoll. Along with Uliga and Djarrit it forms what is known as the "Delap-Uliga-Djarrit".

During World War II was the site of a large base, Naval Base Majuro.

See also
Majuro Airfield

References

Majuro
Populated places in the Marshall Islands